Verkhnesoinsky is a rural locality (a khutor) in Rossoshinskoye Rural Settlement, Uryupinsky District, Volgograd Oblast, Russia. The population was 351 as of 2010. There are 4 streets.

Geography 
Verkhnesoinsky is located in forest steppe, 31 km southwest of Uryupinsk (the district's administrative centre) by road. Nizhnesoinsky is the nearest rural locality.

References 

Rural localities in Uryupinsky District